Guaifenesin protocol is an unapproved treatment for fibromyalgia suggested in the 1990s by R. Paul St. Amand. The protocol involves three parts: titrating the guaifenesin dosage, avoiding salicylates, and following a low-carbohydrate diet if the patient is hypoglycemic. Guaifenesin has not been approved by the FDA for the treatment of fibromyalgia, and the protocol has not been shown to be effective in  clinical trials. Despite the lack of clinical efficacy, the protocol has been adopted by many due to anecdotal evidence of success.

Efficacy
Results of the only reported randomized clinical trial in 1996 found that guaifenesin had no significant effects on pain, other symptoms, or laboratory measures (serum and urinary levels of uric acid and phosphate) over 12 months in a sample of people diagnosed with fibromyalgia syndrome, The lead author of the study has suggested a number of reasons why some patients may have previously reported benefits on this protocol, concluding "St. Amand has unknowingly used guaifenesin as a powerful focus in a program of cognitive behavioral therapy, in which his empathy, enthusiasm and charisma were the real instruments in effecting a beneficial change." St. Amand, who participated as a "Study Advisor" to this clinical trial, has stated that the study did not control for salicylate use, and therefore did not study the protocol as a whole. He has recommended a follow-up study be conducted which controls for all elements of the protocol. The lead author of the study counters that none of the subjects exhibited any signs of salicylate use.

References

Experimental medical treatments